Pallahara (Sl. No.: 59) is a Vidhan Sabha constituency of Angul district, Odisha.

This constituency includes Pallahara block and 19 GPs (Balipasi, Kuluma, Rengali, Susuba, Arkil, Gandamula, Bajrakote, Hanumanpur, Dalaka, Karnapal, Parabil, Burukuna, Kulei, Deranga, Kakudia, Talapada, Biru, Hariharapur and Samal) of Kaniha block.

In 2009 election, Biju Janata Dal candidate Rabi Narayan Pani defeated Bharatiya Janata Party candidate Dharmendra Pradhan by a margin of 5,467 votes.

Elected Members

Fifteen elections were held between 1951 and 2014. Elected members from the Pallahara constituency are:
2019: (59): Mukesh Kumar Pal (BJD)
2014: (59): Mahesh Sahoo (BJD)
2009: (59): Rabi Narayan Pani (BJD)
2004: (121): Nrusingha Sahoo (Congress)
2000: (121): Dharmendra Pradhan (BJP)
1995: (121): Bibhudhendra Pratap Das (Congress)
1990: (121): Nrusingha Charan Sahu (Janata Dal)
1985: (121): Bibhudhendra Pratap Das (Congress)
1980: (121): Bibhudhendra Pratap Das (Congress-I)
1977: (121): Dharanidhar Pradhan (Independent)
1974: (121): Narayan Sahu (Congress)
1971: (133): Narayan Sahu (Congress)
1967: (133): Pabitra Mohan Pradhan (Jana Congress)
1961: (73):  Pabitra Mohan Pradhan (Congress)
1957: (49): Mrutyunjaya Pal (Ganatantra Parishad)
1951: (16): Mahesh Chandra Subahu Singh (Congress)

2019 Election Result

2014 Election Result
In 2014 election, Biju Janata Dal candidate Mahesh Sahoo defeated Bharatiya Janata Party candidate Ashok Mohanty by a margin of 5,294 votes.

Summary of results of the 2009 Election

Notes

References

Assembly constituencies of Odisha
Politics of Angul district
Dhenkanal district